La cumparsita is a 1916 tango by Gerardo Matos Rodríguez

 La cumparsita (es), 1947 film by  Antonio Momplet.
 La cumparsita (es), 1961 film by Enrique Carreras.